Azadeh Rural District is a rural district (dehestan) in Moshrageh District, Ramshir County, Khuzestan Province, Iran. At the 2006 census, its population was 8,225, in 1,864 families.  The rural district has 32 villages.

References 

Rural Districts of Khuzestan Province
Ramshir County